Vincent Roy Margera (July 3, 1956 – November 15, 2015), commonly known as Don Vito, was an American reality television personality. He was known for his appearances in Viva La Bam, Jackass, Haggard, and the CKY series alongside his nephew Bam and brother Phil.

Early life
Margera was born in Chester, Pennsylvania, and raised in Concord Township, the son of Darlene (née Stauffer) and Phillip Margera. He was unmarried and lived in a home formerly owned by his brother in West Chester, Pennsylvania, where he had moved in the early 2000s.

Career
Margera became known after appearing as a regular on the MTV television series Viva La Bam, where he was commonly referred to as "Don Vito", a nickname given to him by his nephew Bam. The nickname referred to his near unintelligible speech reminiscent of Don Vito Corleone of The Godfather, as well as saluting the Margera family's Italian heritage. He had previously appeared in sketches and videos with his family, most of whom were released as part of the CKY series and some later featured in Jackass.

As a result of his 2006 arrest, the stunts involving Don Vito were removed from the theatrical and DVD release of Jackass Number Two, but several stunts were briefly shown in previews leading up to his arrest. Due to the allegations, he was persona non grata among the cast for a time.

In early 2007, Margera featured in Redman's music video "Put It Down", in which he plays a police officer with Donnell Rawlings. March 20, 2007 saw the release of Vito and Ryan Dunn starring in a Viva La Bam-like, direct-to-DVD film titled Dunn and Vito's Rock Tour.

Legal issues
On August 18, 2006, Margera was arrested at the Colorado Mills Mall in Lakewood, Colorado, on suspicion of inappropriately touching two 12-year-old girls. He was released after posting bail of $50,000.

During a preliminary hearing on February 1, 2007, Margera was represented by Pamela Mackey, the same lawyer who defended Kobe Bryant in his 2003—2005 sexual assault case. There was an arraignment hearing on March 5, 2007, at which Margera pleaded not guilty.

The trial started on October 22 in Golden, Colorado. Margera's attorney argued that his client had been playing his "goofy, outrageous and vulgar" television persona for the girls, portraying Margera as a "benign bumbler", and arguing that Margera's signature arm movement may have been mistaken for breast fondling.

The jury began to deliberate on the afternoon of October 30, returning on October 31. Margera was found guilty of two counts of sexual assault on a minor and acquitted on one count.

In December 2007, Margera was sentenced to 10 years of probation, to be served in Pennsylvania. He was further ordered to not portray the character of "Don Vito" in any capacity (appearing on television, writing books, autograph signings) while serving his sentence. He was also ordered to register as a sex offender in Colorado and Pennsylvania, to receive an evaluation of his mental health and to work on his problems with alcohol.

Health issues and death
Throughout most of his life, Margera was obese and had difficulty exercising due to his weight. He also had strabismus, which made him partially blind in one eye, as well as alcoholism. According to his nephew, Bam, he also suffered from depression following his conviction.

In October 2015, Margera collapsed in his West Chester, Pennsylvania home and was rushed to the hospital, where he remained in a coma for five days. According to family, he was dying of massive organ failure due to years of obesity and alcoholism. Despite initial improvements in the weeks before his death, he died on November 15, 2015, from kidney and liver failure at the age of 59.

Filmography

Films

Television

Music videos

References

External links
 

1956 births
2015 deaths
Deaths from liver failure
Deaths from kidney failure
People from Delaware County, Pennsylvania
American people convicted of child sexual abuse
American people convicted of sexual assault
American people of Italian descent
American television personalities
CKY
Jackass (TV series)
Criminals from Pennsylvania
American male criminals
Alcohol-related deaths in Pennsylvania